The Muchis are people of indigenous origin found in the Indian state of West Bengal. They are also called Chamars as in northern India.

The Muchis or Chamars numbered 995,756  in the 2001 census and were 5.4 per cent of the scheduled caste population of West Bengal.  47.0 per cent of the Muchis were literate –  58.6 per cent males and 34.1 per cent females were literate.

References

Scheduled Tribes of India
Social groups of West Bengal